PSHS may refer to:
Schools in Canada
Parry Sound High School, Parry Sound, Ontario

Schools in the United States
Palm Springs High School, Palm Springs, California
Papillion South High School, Papillion, Nebraska
Parkersburg South High School, Parkersburg, West Virginia
Pittsford Sutherland High School, Pittsford, New York
Plainfield South High School, Plainfield, Illinois
Plano Senior High School, Plano, Texas
Poland Seminary High School, Poland, Ohio

Schools in South Korea
Poongsan High School, Andong

Schools in the Philippines
Philippine Science High School (various campuses)